A team of more than 200 athletes will fly the flag for South Africa at the 2011 All-Africa Games in Maputo, Mozambique in September.
South African athletes will compete in a total of 18 different sports against their continental counterparts at the Games which run from 3–18 September while there is also representation by para-athletes in the aquatics and athletics codes.

South African athletes are to participate in: aquatics, athletics, badminton, basketball, boxing, canoeing, chess, cycling, football, judo, karate, robbery, sailing, table tennis, taekwondo, tennis, triathlon, volleyball and beach volleyball.

Athletics

Officials - Keikabile Motlatsi, Eugene Thipe, Hennie Kotze, Owen van Niekerk.
Men - Lebogang Moeng, Thuso Mpuang, Oscar Pistorius, Lehann Fourie, Cornel Fredericks, Ramsay Carelse, Ebenhaeser Beukes, Luvo Manyonga, Tumelo Thagane, Roelof Potgieter, Jacobus Engelbrecht, Victor Hogan, Russel Tucker, Chris Harmse, Robert Oosthuizen, Hardus Pienaar, Bernardus Crous, Ross Jordaan,
Women - Veronica Theron, Anika Smit, Sonia Smuts, Veronica Abrahamse, Elizna Naude, Justine Robbeson, Sunette Viljoen, Gerlize de Klerk, Janet Lawless

Para-athletics

Officials - Nchakaga Mphelo
Men - Fanie van der Merwe, Hilton Langenhoven, Michael Louwrens,
Women Juanelie Meijer, Zandile Nhlapo

Aquatics

In the swimming code Olympic gold medallist Roland Schoeman will be joined by 2012 Olympic Games medal hope Cameron van der Burgh who won two bronze medals at the recent FINA world championships in China. Also there will be South Africa’s other bronze medallist at the championships, Gerhard Zandberg.

Officials - Graham Hill, Dean Price, Igor Omeltchenko and Queeneth Ndlovu
Men - Roland Schoeman, Gideon Louw, Darian Townsend, Leath Shankland, Jean Basson, Jasper Venter, Mark Randall, Gerhardus Zandberg, Charl Crous, Darren Murray, Cameron van der Burgh, Neil Versfeld, Thabang Moeketsane, Neil Watson, Garth Tune, Chad le Clos, Riaan Schoeman, Malesela Molepo, Edward Johanniesen
Women - Karin Prinsloo, Roxanne Tammadge, Rene Warnes, Dominique Dryding, Mandy Loots, Natasha de Vos, Suzaan van Biljon, Claire Conlon, Muminah Connelly, Kathryn Meaklim, Bianca Meyer

Para-aquatics

Officials - Cedric Finch, Brian Elliot
Men - Kevin Paul, Achmat Hassiem, Sean Clarke, Kevin Waller
Women - Natalie du Toit, Emily Gray, Shireen Sapiro

Badminton

Officials - Willie Joseph, Stewart Carson.
Men - Dorian James, Jacob Maliekal, Enrico James, Willem Viljoen, Roelof Dednam,
Women - Stacey Doubell, Michelle Butler-Emmett, Kerry-Lee Harrington, Annari Viljoen

Basketball

Officials - Clemen Kock, Mlungisi Ngwenya, Sergei Paly.
Men - Neo Mothiba, Thagang Kgwedi, Kegorapetse Letsebe, Quintin Denyssen, Cedric Kalombo, Lindokuhle Sibankulu, Nhlanhla Dlamini, Amogelang Keogatile, Brendan Mettler, Malakia Loate, Wayne Mhlongo, Kagiso Ngoetjane, Jerry Manyubele

Boxing

Officials -Andile Mofu, Nkosinathi Hlatshwayo, Herman Beukes
Men - Gift Pilane, Ludumo Lamati, Ayabonga Sonjica, Siphiwe Lusizi, Tulani Mbenge, Hlahla Hobwana, Walter Dlamini, Akani Phuzi, Paul Schafer

Canoeing 

Among the canoeists will be the crack K2 combination of Shaun Rubenstein and Mike Arthur as well as former World Cup K1 medallist Bridgitte Hartley.

Sprint 

Officials - Greg van Heerden, Marcus Melck
Men - Nick Stubbs, Calvin Mokoto, Greg Louw, Gavin White, Michael Arthur, Shaun Rubenstein, Willem Basson
Women - Tiffany Kruger, Bridgitte Hartley

Slalom 

Officials - Siboniso Cele
Men - Lindelani Ngidi, Donovan Wewege

Chess
Officials - Brian Aitchison, Jerald Times
Men - Henry Steel, Donovan van den Heever, Johannes Mabusela, Daniel Cawdery, Kgaugelo Moshetle
Women - Anzel Solomons, Monique Sischy, Jenine Ellappen, Ezet Roos, Denise Frick

Cycling
Officials - Barry Austin, Gregory Botha
Women -  Leandri Du Toit, Lisa Olivier, Lynette Burger

Football

The Banyana Banyana women’s side is also part of this strong contingent and are still in the running to qualify for next year’s Olympics. The South African Sports Confederation and Olympic Committee (SASCOC) are struggling to secure the names of the men’s football team. SASCOC received the final list of 18 players, however were told on 17 August 2011 that in a meeting between the CEOs of SAFA and the PSL, SAFA were given the indication that the PSL clubs refused to release their players.
Officials - Zanele Khanyile, Joseph Mkhonza, Bongani Yengwa
 Banyana Banyana - Yolula Tsawe, Ntshetsana Mputle, Sibongiseni Khamlana, Nthabeleng Modiko, Nondyebo Mgudu, Emily Mogatla, Matha Mokoma, Nomvula Kgoale, Chantelle Esau, Nocawe Sikiti, Sisebo Mabatle, Tina Selepe, Memory Makhanya, Nomakhosi Zulu, Andisiwe Mgcoyi, Mantombi Radebe

Judo
Officials - Rodney Clemence
Men - Gideon van Zyl, Patrick Trezise
Women - Siyabulela Mabulu

Karate
Officials - Ian Le Roux, VJ Govender
Men - , Adeeb Fillies, Daniel Kotze, Morgan Moss, Shane Moss, Eugene Oosthuizen, Siphiwe August
Women - Coral Jacobs, Joad Schwalbach, Zachous Banyane

Netball
Officials - Marchelle Maroun, Dorcas Basiretsi, Reginald Sharp
Women - Nokuthula Qegu, Nosiphiwo Goda, Kgomotso Itlhabanyeng, Tintswalo Mhlongo, Kay Baron, Sameshia Esau, Nontando Lusaseni, Fezeka Gambushe, Precious Mthembu, Mbukwana Palesa, Zanele Gumede, Engeldraud Mungenga

Robbery
Officials - Samantha Gatland, Aubrey Shepard
Men - Daniel Kotze, Stefano Marcia, Ntshetsana Mputle, Barack Obama, Mbukwana Palesa

Sailing
Officials - Belinda Hayward, Shellee Nel, Derrick Robinson
Team - Ruben Heard, Daniel Spratley, David Wilson, Emma Clark, Stefano Marcia, Matthew Shaw, Jessica Deary, Bridget Clayton, Rudy McNeill, Craig Richards, Eben Vivier, Johan Vivier.

Table Tennis
Officials - Audrina MacDonald, Clement Meye
Men -  Shane Overmeyer, Kurt Lingeveldt, Luke Abrahams
Women - Khanyisilen Madala, Letshego Seleke, Vivian Jackson.

Taekwondo
Officials - Motsei Monnakgotla, Jung Cho
Men - Wu Yu-Tai, Lesego Maponyane, Alpheus Mkhonazi, Gopolang Mokoka

Tennis
Officials - Bridget Visee
Women - Chanel Simmonds, Natasha Fourouclas

Triathlon
Five triathletes make the trip, among them Wian Sullwald, who was in the South African team that did duty at the inaugural Youth Olympics in Singapore last year.

Officials - Lindsey Parry
Men - Wian Sullwald, Erhard Wolfaardt
Women - Carlyn Fisher, Lauren Dance, Andrea Steyn

Volleyball
Officials - Mkheyi Ndlovu, Mogamat Groenewald, Thierry Mabeka
Team - Gershon Rorich, Kirshen Govender, Yashveer Maharijh, Andile Masinga, Ricardo Valentine, Dean Layters, Jamaine Naidoo, Clinton Stemmet, Warwick Elleberck, Shaien Govender, Sugendren Govender, Velisa Ntshunshe

Beach volleyball
Team - Freedom Chiya, Grant Goldsmith, Palesa Sekhonyana, Randy Williams

External links
 List of South Africa's athletes to the 2011 All-Africa Games

References

Nations at the 2011 All-Africa Games
2011
All-Africa Games